Andreas Wisniewski (born 3 July 1959) is a German actor and former dancer. He is best known for his portrayals of Necros in the 1987 Bond film The Living Daylights, Max's companion in the 1996 film Mission: Impossible, and as one of Hans Gruber's henchmen, Tony, in 1988's Die Hard.

Life and career
Wisniewski was born in Berlin, Germany, to a Polish father and a German mother, and spent the early part of his life dancing before turning to acting. Wisniewski made his big-screen debut in Gothic (1986), a film about Mary Shelley's Frankenstein, in which Wisniewski plays the role of Fletcher.

Probably his biggest film came the following year in 1987 Bond film The Living Daylights. The  Wisniewski portrays lethal hitman Necros, who over the course of the film impersonates a Cockney milkman, an American jogger, an Austrian balloon salesman, and a doctor in Morocco. His next mainstream role was as one of Hans Gruber's (Alan Rickman) henchmen, Tony, in the 1988 film Die Hard.

Wisniewski disappeared from the big screen only to reappear in the TV shows Superboy, Mann & Machine and Northern Exposure where he played Arthur, the bear. He reappeared on the big screen in the 1995 science fiction film Death Machine playing Weyland, and again in 1996 in a non-speaking role as Max's companion in another box office smash, Mission: Impossible.

Wisniewski soon starred in a string of German films, after which he reappeared to UK audiences in an episode of the TV series Lock, Stock...The Series based on the gangster film by Guy Ritchie, where he played mullet-wearing Heinrich who accidentally commits suicide by shooting himself in the head playing a film game. Two years later he was in an episode of the ITV hit series Ultimate Force alongside popular soap opera star Ross Kemp playing Serbian terrorist Savo Glasnovic. Wisniewski hit the screens (although his face is never seen) in the UK again in 2008 after a six-year break when he co-starred in Mark Tonderai's cat-and-mouse thriller Hush.

Wisniewski has also appeared in two music videos. He was in the video "Venus", sung by the girl group Bananarama, and also appeared as a soldier in the background of Elton John's video "Nikita", where can be seen as Elton John's Bentley Continental pulls up to the security gate.

In 2001 Wisniewski turned his hand to directing, making the short film Inspiration, starring English actors Danny Webb and Christine Adams. Another Andreas Wisniewski, credited in the bio-pic Surviving Picasso alongside Anthony Hopkins, is a different actor. Wisniewski has kept a low profile since this time to spend time with his family and children and to concentrate on Buddhism.

He made a rare British TV appearance in ITV's police drama The Bill. He appeared on 10 July 2008 in the episode Gun Runner: Pay and Spray, in which he played a short one-minute role as a Russian criminal 'Dimitri' purchasing guns and ammunition.

Fifteen years after his first appearance in a Mission: Impossible-film, he had another non-speaking part in 2011's Mission: Impossible – Ghost Protocol, playing the same character from the first film of the series- though working for a different employer, he and Ethan smile as they recognise each other, and he makes Ethan wear a near-identical mask as in the first movie.

Personal life
Wisniewski has three children and lives in Berlin. He is a practising Zen Buddhist.

Filmography

Gothic (1986) .... Fletcher
Aria (1987) .... (segment "Nessun dorma")
The Living Daylights (1987) .... Necros
Die Hard (1988) .... Tony
Superboy (1989, TV Series) .... Android
Northern Exposure (1992, TV Series) .... Arthur
Mann & Machine (1993, TV Series) .... John Stepka
The Hit List (1993) .... Lance
Death Machine (1995) .... Weyland
Mission: Impossible (1996) .... Max's Companion
Surviving Picasso (1996) .... German Soldier
Supply & Demand (1997, TV Movie) .... John Howard
Kidnapping Mom & Dad (1998, TV Movie) .... Holger
The Tribe (1998) .... Lieutenant
Urban Ghost Story (1998) .... Quinn
Heroes and Other Cowards (1998) .... Ernesto
The Waiting Time (1999, TV Movie)  .... Ernst Raub
Lock, Stock...The Series (2000, TV Series) .... Heinrich
Ultimate Force (2002, TV Series) .... Savo Glasnovic
Essential Music Videos: Classic '80s (2004) .... (Segment 'Venus')
Hush (2008) .... Tarman
The Bill (2008, TV Series) .... Dimitri
The Scorpion King 2: Rise of a Warrior (2008) .... Pollux
Centurion (2010) .... Commander Gratus
Urban Explorer (2011) .... Neo-Nazi
Mission: Impossible – Ghost Protocol (2011) .... The Fog's Contact
Bela Kiss: Prologue (2013) .... Private Charles Nagy (voice)
Instrument of War (2017) .... Karl Herrmann

References

External links

1959 births
Living people
German actors
Polish actors
German people of Polish descent
German Buddhists
Polish Buddhists
Converts to Buddhism
German Zen Buddhists
Polish Zen Buddhists
German expatriates in England